Mouse and Mole is a 1996 British television series devised by Joy Whitby's Grasshopper Productions. It was based on the series of children's books written by Joyce Dunbar and illustrated by James Mayhew which were first published in 1993 by Transworld, and later by Graffeg Ltd. Originally envisaged as 26 x 5 minute episodes, only 19 were ever finished, although the soundtracks for the remaining seven episodes, created by Ben Baird at Aquarium Studios are still in existence.

The Characters of Mouse and Mole were played by Richard Briers and Alan Bennett respectively. The character of Mole was originally to be played by Stephen Fry, but shortly before the recording session, Fry became unavailable, and Alan Bennett stepped in on the proviso that he would step aside should Fry become available.

In 2013 Grasshopper Productions in partnership with Baird TV and Clive Juster and Associates, created a 28-minute Christmas Special entitled "Mouse and Mole at Christmas Time". Richard Briers and Alan Bennett are joined by Imelda Staunton for this one-off 'special', screened in December 2013 on BBC television.

Episodes

References

External links

BBC children's television shows
Fictional moles
Animated television series about mammals
Animated television series about mice and rats
British children's animated adventure television series